Kilburn and the High Roads were a British pub rock band formed in London by Ian Dury in 1970. The band released one studio album in 1975, disbanding the same year. AllMusic credits the band with being "an undeniable influence on punk and new wave".

History 
Dury formed Kilburn and the High Roads in 1970. The band consisted of Ian Dury as lead vocalist and lyricist, pianist Russell Hardy, guitarist Edward "Ted" Speight (later replaced by Keith Lucas), bassist Charlie Hart (later replaced by Humphrey Ocean and later by Charley Sinclair),  saxophonist George Khan (later replaced by Davey Payne) and drummer Chris Lucas (replaced by Terry Day and later by David Newton-Rohoman, who used crutches). The band performed their first gig in 1971 and were regulars on the pub rock scene by 1973. The Kilburns also supported the Who on their Quadrophenia tour of late 1973.

The band signed to Warner Bros. subsidiary Raft Records and recorded an album in 1974 but it remained unreleased when the label was shut down. The band were managed by fashion entrepreneur Tommy Roberts, presaging acquaintance Malcolm McLaren's involvement with the Sex Pistols. Signing to Pye subsidiary Dawn Records, the band released debut single "Rough Kids" the same year and a second single and their re-recorded debut album  Handsome in 1975, before disbanding soon afterwards. 

Dury then formed the short-lived Ian Dury and the Kilburns and later, with different personnel, a new group, Ian Dury and the Blockheads, initially releasing records under his own name alone. Dury's solo success led to the release of a second Kilburn and the High Roads album, Wotabunch! in 1977, despite the group's earlier demise, largely duplicating the first album but remixed from earlier demos and later a compilation EP, The Best of Kilburn & the High Roads on Dury's next label, Stiff Records, in 1983.

In 2016, Cherry Red Records released an expanded edition of Handsome with a bonus disc containing a previously unreleased 1974 Capital Radio broadcast.

Legacy
Davey Payne followed Dury into the Blockheads. Keith Lucas (as Nick Cash) went on to form punk band 999. Humphrey Ocean recorded a one-off single for Stiff Records in 1978, written by Dury. 

Suggs has credited Kilburn and the High Roads with being "a huge influence" on Madness. Paul Simonon of the Clash has credited Dury as an influence on punk. The Sex Pistols were inspired by Chris Thomas' production on the first Kilburn's single to work with him; it has also been suggested that John Lydon borrowed some of his early performance style from Dury, although the claim is rejected by Lydon.

Personnel

Kilburn & the High Roads 

 Ian Dury – lead vocal, percussion (also lyricist and songwriter) 
 Russell Hardy – piano (also songwriter) 
 Rod Melvin – piano, vocals (also songwriter) 
 Edward "Ted" Speight – guitar 
 Keith Lucas (Nick Cash) – guitar 
 Charlie Hart – bass 
 Ian Smith – bass 
 Humphrey Ocean – bass 
 Charley Sinclair – bass 
 George Khan – saxophone 
 Davey Payne – saxophone 
 Terry Day – drums 
 Chris Lucas – drums 
 David Newton-Rohoman – drums 
 George Butler – drums

Ian Dury & the Kilburns 

 Ian Dury – lead vocal 
 Rod Melvin – keyboards 
 Edward "Ted" Speight – guitar 
 John Earle – saxophone 
 Giorgi Dionisiev – bass 
 Malcolm Mortimore – drums 
 Chaz Jankel – keyboards, guitar

Discography

Studio albums

Singles

Compilations

References

External links
 Official Ian Dury website
 AllMusic biography

English rock music groups
British pub rock music groups
Musical groups from London
Protopunk groups
Dawn Records artists
Pye Records artists
Warner Records artists